64079 is the twenty-third Lucas number and is thus often written as L23. It is significant for being the first Lucas number Ln where n is prime that is itself not prime, after L3=4.

Other uses
64079 is the zip code of Platte City and Tracy, Missouri.

References

Integers